Xiphoceriana is a genus of grasshoppers belonging to the family Pamphagidae.

Species
 Xiphoceriana arabica (Uvarov, 1922)
 Xiphoceriana atrox (Gerstaecker, 1869)
 Xiphoceriana brunneriana (Saussure, 1887)
 Xiphoceriana cristata (Saussure, 1887)

References

Caelifera genera
Pamphagidae